Galectin-8 is a protein of the galectin family that in humans is encoded by the LGALS8 gene.

Function 

This gene encodes a member of the galectin family. Galectins are beta-galactoside-binding animal lectins with conserved carbohydrate recognition domains. The galectins have been implicated in many essential functions including development, differentiation, cell-cell adhesion, cell-matrix interaction, growth regulation, apoptosis, and RNA splicing. This gene is widely expressed in tumoral tissues and seems to be involved in integrin-like cell interactions. Alternatively spliced transcript variants encoding different isoforms have been identified.

Galectin-8, interacts with the mTOR regulatory system composed of SLC38A9, Ragulator, RagAB, RagCD. Galectin-8 controls mTOR causing its inactivation and dissociation from  damaged lysosomes, hence  transducing the breach of the lysosomal membrane to mTOR. The physiological consequences of mTOR inhibition following lysosomal membrane damage encompass autophagy and metabolic switching.

Role in cellular defence

Galectin-8 has recently been shown to have a role in cellular defence, against both bacterial cytosolic infection and vacuolar damage. Many intracellular bacteria, such as S. enterica serovar Typhimurium and S. flexneri prefer to replicate inside and outside  of the vacuole safety respectively, yet these vacuoles may become damaged, exposing bacteria to the host cell cytoplasm. It has been shown that the binding of galectin-8 to the damaged vacuole can recruit autophagy adaptors such as NDP52 leading to the formation of an autophagosome and subsequent bacterial destruction. As knockout experiments of galectin-8 leads to more successful cytosolic replication by S. enterica serovar Typhimurium, it is thought that galectin-8 acts as a danger receptor in defence against intracellular pathogens.

Engineered Galectin 8 Assays 

Galectin-8 has also been used to study endosomal disruption in the development of nanoscale drug delivery systems. Many drug delivery systems carrying large molecule drugs, such as antisense oligonucleotides, siRNA, peptides, and therapeutic proteins, are engineered to be pH-responsive, and disrupt the endosomal membrane because of the lower pH found within progressively acidifying endosomes. Galectin-8 can be tagged with a fluorophore to track these disrupted endosomal membranes, especially when coupled with automated microscopy.

Interactions 

Galectin-8 has been shown to interact with CD49d, CD29 and CD49c. It also interacts with components of the mTORC1 complex.

References

Further reading